This is a list of Nepalese first-class cricketers. First-class cricket matches are those between international teams or the highest standard of domestic teams in which teams have two innings each. Generally, matches are eleven players a side but there have been exceptions. 

Today all matches must be scheduled to have at least three days' duration; historically, matches were played to a finish with no pre-defined time span. 

This list is not limited to those who have played first-class cricket for Nepal and may include Nepalese players who played their first-class cricket elsewhere. The players are listed alphabetically by their last name.

Key

Players 

Statistics are correct as of Nepal's most recent First-class match, against Marylebone Cricket Club on 6 November 2019.

See also 
 Nepal national cricket team
 First-class cricket
 List of Nepal Twenty20 International cricketers
 List of Nepalese List A cricketers
 List of Nepalese Twenty20 cricketers

References 

First-class
Nepalese